Arazbarı is a village and municipality in the Bilasuvar Rayon of Azerbaijan. It has a population of 387.

References

Populated places in Bilasuvar District